Taibur Rahman (born 10 August 1991) is a Bangladeshi cricketer.

In February 2018, Rahman and Abul Hasan scored 136 runs for the eighth wicket for Kala Bagan Krira Chakra against Khelaghar Samaj Kallyan Samity in the 2017–18 Dhaka Premier Division Cricket League. Before the partnership, Kala Bagan Krira Chakra were 34 for 7 in the eleventh over of the match. This was the first partnership of more than 100 runs for a team seven wickets down for fewer than 100 runs in List A cricket in Bangladesh. He was the leading run-scorer in the 2019–20 National Cricket League, with 523 runs in six matches.

References

External links
 

1991 births
Living people
Bangladeshi cricketers
Dhaka Division cricketers
Khulna Division cricketers
People from Narayanganj District
Khulna Tigers cricketers
Kala Bagan Krira Chakra cricketers